USS R-8 (SS-85) was an R-class coastal and harbor defense submarine of the United States Navy.

Construction and commissioning
R-8′s keel was laid down on 4 March 1918 by the Fore River Shipbuilding Company, Quincy, Massachusetts. She was launched on 17 April 1919, sponsored by Ms. Penelope Potter, and commissioned on 21 July 1919.

Service history

1919–1929
R-8 fitted out at Boston, Massachusetts, during the fall of 1919, proceeded to New London, Connecticut on 5 December, joined other boats of Submarine Division 9 (SubDiv 9), and continued south for winter exercises in the Gulf of Mexico. She operated out of Pensacola, Florida, until returning to New England in April. Given hull classification symbol "SS-85" in July, she departed Newport, Rhode Island on 13 September and two days later arrived at Norfolk for overhaul prior to transfer to the Pacific Fleet. Sea trials in early April 1921 followed, and on 21 April she headed south. Transiting the Panama Canal in May, she arrived at San Pedro, California, her new homeport on 30 June, and for the next two years conducted exercises — individual, divisional and fleet — off the coasts of California and Mexico.

On 16 July 1923, R-8 sailed west for Pearl Harbor, her base for almost eight years — during which she engaged in training and operations with fleet units. In late October 1925, she collided with the minesweeper , suffering the loss of her periscopes, the destruction of her bridge, and damage to her radio antenna supports. In August 1927, she searched for missing Dole Air Race aviators.

1930–1936
Ordered back to the East Coast for inactivation in 1930, R-8 departed Pearl Harbor on 12 December, transited the Panama Canal in mid-January 1931, and arrived at Philadelphia, Pennsylvania, on 9 February 1931. Decommissioned on 2 May 1931, she was berthed at Philadelphia as a unit of the Reserve Fleet until 1936. On 26 February 1936, while still in a state of preservation, she sank. Later raised, she was struck from the Naval Vessel Register on 12 May 1936 and on 19 August 1936 she was used as a target vessel for an aerial bombing test.

Wreck
Her wreck was initially not found.  Per Eastern Search and Survey  "Our research effort began to bear fruit after several iterations of requests to the National Archives. Station logs for the Philadelphia Navy Yard identified the USS CORMORANT (AM-40) as the vessel that towed the 1936 Sub out to be scuttled. CORMORANT’s log provided the sinking location as being far offshore from the VA-NC border in ~4,300’ of water: nearly 70 miles south of where it was previously thought to be.

However, in December 2020, the remains of R-8 were discovered off the coast of Ocean City, Maryland.[5] The vessel sank there in 1936, after being used for target practice by bombers.

References

External links

United States R-class submarines
United States submarine accidents
Maritime incidents in 1925
Maritime incidents in 1936
Ships built in Quincy, Massachusetts
1919 ships
Ships sunk as targets
Shipwrecks of the Virginia coast
Atlantic Reserve Fleet, Philadelphia Group